Casa Cristo  is a house located in Encamp, Andorra. It is a heritage property registered in the Cultural Heritage of Andorra.

References

Encamp
Houses in Andorra
Cultural Heritage of Andorra